José Marmol is a city in Greater Buenos Aires, Argentina, located 25 km south of Buenos Aires. It belongs to the Almirante Brown Partido (district). It has 5.14 km2, thus occupying 3.97% of the district. Its population was 40,612 inhabitants (INDEC, 2001), grew 4.6% from the 38,842 inhabitants (INDEC 1991) of the previous census, population density of 7,091 inhabitants / km ². In 1991 19.037 men and 19.805 women were counted, according to the 1991 national census. In that year there was also determined 11,290 homes.

External links

Almirante Brown Partido
Populated places in Buenos Aires Province
Cities in Argentina